Tra le fiamme (Il consiglio) (HWV 170) is a dramatic secular cantata for soprano and instruments written by Georg Frideric Handel in 1707. Other catalogues of Handel's music have referred to the work as HG liiB,66; and HHA v/5,55. The title of the cantata translates as "In flames (Counsel)".

History
The text for the work was written by Cardinal Benedetto Pamphili. The payment on 6 July 1707 (recorded in Pamphili's account books) for the copying of a large cantata probably refers to Tra le fiamme.

Synopsis
Using the analogy of butterflies attracted to a flame, and the story of Daedalus (who constructed wings made from wax and feathers for himself and his son Icarus), Pamphili uses the cantata to issue a warning to his audience: that the phoenix can rise from the flames, however the butterflies will be killed. It is possible that the cardinal was also directing the warning specifically to Handel, as there was a rumour at the time about a relationship between Handel (then twenty-two) and the singer Vittoria Tarquini (who was the mistress of Prince Ferdinand de' Medici of Florence).

Structure
The work is scored for two recorders (flauto), oboes (hautbois), two violins, viola da gamba, a "Violone Grosso" (as specified in Handel's autograph) and, as customary practice in the 18th century, a harpsichord. The work is notable for having a virtuoso part for the viola da gamba. The cantata begins with an aria followed by two recitative-aria pairings, after which a final recitative is performed before an instruction to repeat ("Da Capo") the cantata's opening aria (an unusual feature in Handel cantatas).

A typical performance of the work takes about seventeen and a half minutes.

Movements
The work consists of seven movements (with the final movement being a partial repeat of the first):

(Movements do not contain repeat markings unless indicated. The number of bars is the raw number in the manuscript—not including repeat markings. The above is taken from volume 52B, starting at page 66, of the Händel-Gesellschaft edition.)

See also
List of cantatas by George Frideric Handel

References

Citations

Sources

Cantatas by George Frideric Handel
1707 compositions